Sofia Arvidsson and Jill Craybas were the defending champions, but both players chose not to participate.

Magda Linette and Sandra Zaniewska won the title, defeating Irena Pavlovic and Stefanie Vögele in the final, 6–1, 5–7, [10–5].

Seeds

Draw

External Links
 Main draw

Open GDF Suez Region Limousin - Doubles
Open de Limoges